Evaldas Razulis (born 3 April 1986) is a Lithuanian football coach and former player who played as a forward.

Club career
Born in Mažeikiai, Lithuania, Razulis started his career with FK Nafta in the Lithuanian second division. In 2003, at the age of 16, he moved to Russia to sign for Krylya Sovetov Samara. He spent five years playing for the club's reserve team, and failed to make a single first team appearance. He returned to his home country in 2008 and joined FK Vetra.

On 2 February 2011, Razulis signed for Hearts, originally on loan until the end of the season.

On 22 July 2011 he returned to Kaunas on loan.

On 31 January 2012, Razulis made his loan move to Kaunas permanent for his second spell at the club.

On 9 December 2016 he signed a contract with Latvian vice-champions Jelgava.

International goals
Scores and results list Lithuania's goal tally first.

References

External links
 Profile at Futbolinis
 

1986 births
Living people
Lithuanian footballers
Association football forwards
Lithuania international footballers
Lithuanian expatriate footballers
Expatriate footballers in Russia
Expatriate footballers in Belarus
Expatriate footballers in Scotland
Expatriate footballers in Poland
Expatriate footballers in Latvia
Lithuanian expatriate sportspeople in Russia
Lithuanian expatriate sportspeople in Belarus
Lithuanian expatriate sportspeople in Scotland
Lithuanian expatriate sportspeople in Poland
Lithuanian expatriate sportspeople in Latvia
A Lyga players
Belarusian Premier League players
Ekstraklasa players
PFC Krylia Sovetov Samara players
FK Vėtra players
FK Šilutė players
FBK Kaunas footballers
FC Partizan Minsk players
Heart of Midlothian F.C. players
FK Atlantas players
Górnik Łęczna players
FK Jelgava players
Lithuanian football managers